Spain competed at the 2020 Winter Youth Olympics in Lausanne, Switzerland from 9 to 22 January 2020.

Medalists

Alpine skiing

Boys

Girls

Curling

Spain qualified a mixed team of four athletes.
Mixed team

Mixed doubles

Ice hockey

See also
Spain at the 2020 Summer Olympics

References

2020 in Spanish sport
Nations at the 2020 Winter Youth Olympics
Spain at the Youth Olympics